A.S. Roma Youth Sector is the youth set-up of Italian club A.S. Roma. The under-19 team (Primavera) currently competes in the Campionato Primavera 1, as well as the Coppa Italia Primavera, and regularly compete in the continental UEFA Youth League (2014–15, 2015–16 and 2016–17). 

Roma Primavera have enjoyed much success over the years, winning the Campionato Nazionale Primavera eight times, the Coppa Italia Primavera five times and Torneo di Viareggio thrice.

Players to have graduated from the A.S. Roma Primavera squad include Bruno Conti, Agostino Di Bartolomei and Giuseppe Giannini, as well as current first team players Daniele De Rossi, Alessandro Florenzi and club captain, record appearance holder and record goalscorer Francesco Totti. Alberto De Rossi, father of Daniele De Rossi, has been Head coach of Roma Primavera since 2005.

Honours

Players

Current squad

Other players under contract

Associated clubs
A.S. Roma Youth Sector are associated with many local clubs and football schools and others across Italy and abroad. Most notably, the Totti Soccer School, L'Aquila and Serie D side, F.C. Rieti, whose home stadium Stadio Centro d'Italia – Manlio Scopigno is used by the Primavera for select matches including the UEFA Youth League.

References

A.S. Roma
Football academies in Italy
UEFA Youth League teams